Dora Colvin is a pioneering woman in the trucking industry in the United States. In over four decade, Colvin has driven for 2 million miles without an accident, and blazed the path for women into another male-dominated occupation.

Biography 
Colvin grew up in remote North Dakota on a farm, where she drove a truck. Today, she lives in Udall, Kansas.  Her original occupation was as a teacher, and she first started driving with her husband, Butch, during the summer. She worked in a team with her husband Butch for 18 years before they retired in 2010.  The Colvins have four children and six grandchildren.

In 1965, Colvin became the first woman to hold a CDL license in Kansas. In 1972, she became the first woman to drive for the produce company, Stanley Dilley and in 1992, was the first woman to drive for the chemical hauler, Wynne Tank Lines.

In 2004, Colvin and her husband were named Company Team of the Year for CFI. In April 2006 Colvin became the first woman to be named Company Equipment Driver of the Year by Truckload Carriers Association and sponsored by Truckers News.  On April 7, 2006, Colvin was mentioned on Paul Harvey's short radio newscast on ABC stations across the nation.

References

External links
Truckinginfo.com profile

Living people
Year of birth missing (living people)
People from North Dakota
American truck drivers